MRDC may refer to:

Midwestern Robotics Design Competition - an annual robotics competition
Mineral Resources Development Company - an investment management company